Maksim Smirnov (born 28 December 1979 in Tallinn) is a retired Estonian professional footballer. He played the position of midfielder.

Club career
On 7 March 2010, he joined FC Narva Trans on loan for the first half of the season.

International career
He is also the former member of the Estonia national football team with 39 caps and 2 goal to his name.

Honours

Club
 JK Nõmme Kalju
 Estonian Cup
 Runners Up: 2008–09

References

External links
 Nõmme Kalju profile
 Profile, Jalgpall.ee

1979 births
Living people
Footballers from Tallinn
Estonian footballers
Estonia international footballers
Estonian people of Russian descent
FCI Levadia Tallinn players
FC TVMK players
FC Flora players
Viljandi JK Tulevik players
FC Valga players
FC Kuressaare players
FK Ventspils players
Nõmme Kalju FC players
JK Narva Trans players
Estonian expatriate footballers
Estonian expatriate sportspeople in Latvia
Expatriate footballers in Latvia
FC Kiviõli Irbis players
Association football wingers